Jolietville is a neighborhood of Westfield, Indiana, in Washington Township, Hamilton County, Indiana. It was formerly an unincorporated community, but was annexed by Westfield in the late 2000s or early 2010s.

Geography
The community is located at the intersection of Indiana State Road 32 and Joliet Road, just east of the Indianapolis Executive Airport.

References

Populated places in Hamilton County, Indiana
Indianapolis metropolitan area
Neighborhoods in Indiana